The 2005 Canada Summer Games were held in Regina, Saskatchewan, from August 6–20, 2005.

Medal standings

Venues
Athletics - Douglas Park Track
Baseball - Currie Field and Optimist Park
Basketball - The Centre for Kinesiology, Health and Sport, University of Regina
Canoeing - Wascana Lake
Cycling - Lumsden, Wascana Trails, University of Regina and Wascana Park
Diving - Lawson Aquatic Centre
Field hockey - Taylor Field
Rowing - Wascana Lake
Rugby union - Regina Rugby Park
Sailing - Saskatchewan Beach
Women's Soccer - Mount Pleasant Sports Park
Men's Soccer - Moose Jaw
Women's Softball - Elks Athletic Park, Moose Jaw
Men's Softball - Rambler Park
Swimming - Lawson Aquatic Centre
Tennis - Lakeshore Tennis Club
Volleyball - The Centre for Kinesiology, Health and Sport, University of Regina
Wrestling - Regina Exhibition Park

See also
Canada Games
Canada Summer Games
List of Canada Games

! colspan="3" style="background:#78FF78;" | Canada Games

Canada Games
Canada Games, 2005
Sports competitions in Regina, Saskatchewan
2005